Pavel Georgievich Pegov (born 29 November 1956 in Moscow, Russian SFSR) is a former speed skater who specialised in the shorter 500 metres and 1000 metres distances. He studied at the East Siberian Technological Institute and trained with Nina Bobrova, and later at the Armed Forces sports society. He peaked in 1983 when he broke four world records. 

Skating for the Soviet Union, Pavel Pegov finished second behind Japanese skater Akira Kuroiwa at the World Sprint Championships of 1983. In March that year, on the Medeo rink at Alma-Ata, he broke Yevgeny Kulikov's two-year-old world record on the 500 m. On the 25th of that month, he clocked 36.68, and a day later he sharpened the record to 36.57. That same weekend, he raced a perfect 1000 m – setting a legendary world record time of 1:12.58. He was the first speed skater to skate the 1000 m in less than 1 minute and 13 seconds and, although Igor Zhelezovski managed to equal this time six years later, Pegov's world record would stand undefeated for over ten years; Kevin Scott clocked 1:12.54 in Calgary 19 December 1993. His four Medeo races of 36.68, 1:12.58, 36.57, and 1:14.83 gave him another world record – the sprint combination samalogue point sum 146.955. This record lasted until Igor Zhelezovski very narrowly improved it to 146.945 in Heerenveen in February 1989. 

Pegov never regained his eminence after 1983, finishing only 13th in the 1000 m at the 1984 Winter Olympics. A few weeks after the Olympics, he finished second, behind Sergey Khlebnikov, at the Soviet Sprint Championships. Pegov retired as an elite speed skater in 1985.

Records

World records 
Over the course of his career, Pegov held four world records:

Source: SpeedSkatingStats.com

Personal records

Pegov has an Adelskalender score of 163.570 points.

References

External links
 
 
 
 
 Pavel Pegov at SpeedSkatingStats.com
 Personal records from Jakub Majerski's Speedskating Database
 

1956 births
Living people
Russian male speed skaters
Soviet male speed skaters
Olympic speed skaters of the Soviet Union
Speed skaters at the 1984 Winter Olympics
World record setters in speed skating
World Sprint Speed Skating Championships medalists